Karsten M. Heeger is a German–American physicist and Eugene Higgins Professor of Physics at Yale University, where he also serves as both chair of the Yale Department of Physics and director of Wright Laboratory. His work is primarily in the area of neutrino physics, focusing on the study of neutrino oscillations, neutrino mass, and dark matter.

Education and Career 
Prof. Heeger received his undergraduate degree in physics from Oxford University and his Ph.D. from the University of Washington in Seattle, where he worked on a model-independent measurement of the solar 8B neutrino flux in the Sudbury Neutrino Observatory (SNO). Before joining the faculty at Yale University,  he was on the faculty at the University of Wisconsin and a Chamberlain Fellow at Lawrence Berkeley National Laboratory.

Heeger has served on national and international committees including the High Energy Physics Advisory Panel (HEPAP), the Nuclear Science Advisory Committee (NSAC), the Division of Particles and Fields (DPF) Executive Committee, and the American Physical Society (APS) Committee on International Scientific Affairs. He was a member of the 2015 Nuclear Physics Long Range Planning Group, the US ATLAS Project Advisory Group, and has served on review committees for the United States Department of Energy, the National Science Foundation, and the Natural Sciences and Engineering Council of Canada (NSERC). He is co-chair of the APS DPF Coordinating Panel of Advanced Detectors (CPAD).

Prof. Heeger has been the director of the Yale Wright Laboratory since 2013 and was named Chair of the Department of Physics at Yale University in 2019.

Research 
Professor Heeger’s research focuses on the study of neutrino oscillations and neutrino mass. He was involved in the resolution of the solar neutrino problem with the Sudbury Neutrino Observatory (SNO), the first observation of reactor antineutrino oscillation with KamLAND, and the first measurement of the neutrino mixing angle q13 with Daya Bay.

Heeger is PI and co-spokesperson of PROSPECT, a precision measurement of reactor antineutrinos and search for sterile neutrinos, at very short baselines. He is studying the nature of neutrinos with the CUORE double beta decay experiment and performing R&D with Project 8 towards a novel experiment to measure neutrino mass.

As a graduate student, Heeger worked on the Sudbury Neutrino Observatory, where his dissertation on a measurement of the 8B solar neutrino flux was awarded the 2003 Dissertation Award in Nuclear Physics by the American Physical Society.

Honors and awards 
Heeger’s research work has been recognized with numerous awards. For his thesis work he was awarded the 2003 APS Dissertation Award in Nuclear Physics. In 2008 he received Outstanding Junior Investigator awards from DOE Nuclear Physics for the investigation of neutrino properties with bolometric detectors and from DOE High Energy Physics for the measurement of the neutrino mixing angle theta13 at Daya Bay. Heeger was awarded an Alfred P. Sloan Research Fellowship in 2009 and a UW Romnes Faculty Fellowship in 2011. He was named a Kavli Fellow in 2012 and elected APS Fellow in 2013. He shared the 2016 Breakthrough Prize in Fundamental Physics as a member of three collaborations: SNO, KamLAND, and Daya Bay.

Selected publications 
A list of selected publications can be found on INSPIRE-HEP.

Personal life
Heeger married experimental physicist, Reina Maruyama, in 2004.

References 

21st-century American physicists
Alumni of the University of Oxford
University of Washington alumni
University of Wisconsin–Madison faculty
Yale University faculty
Living people
Fellows of the American Physical Society
Year of birth missing (living people)